Paulo Oktavianus Sitanggang (born in North Sumatra, Indonesia, 17 October 1995) is an Indonesian professional footballer who plays as a midfielder for Liga 1 club Persita Tangerang, on loan from Borneo Samarinda.

Club career

Barito Putera
On 21 October 2014, Paulo signed a three-year contract with Barito Putera to commence ahead of the 2015 Indonesia Super League. He made his debut on 4 April 2015, replacing Manahati Lestusen in the 51st minute of a 2–0 victory against Persela Lamongan.

Persik Kediri
He was signed for Persik Kediri to play in Liga 1. Sitanggang made his league debut on 6 March 2020 in a match against Bhayangkara at the Brawijaya Stadium, Kediri.

PSMS Medan
In 2021, Sitanggang signed for PSMS Medan to play in the Liga 2 in the 2020 season. This season was suspended on 27 March 2020 due to the COVID-19 pandemic. The season was abandoned and was declared void on 20 January 2021.

Borneo
He was signed for Borneo to play in Liga 1. Sitanggang made his league debut on 10 September 2021 in a match against Persik Kediri at the Pakansari Stadium, Cibinong.

Persita Tengerang (loan)
Sitanggang was signed for Persita Tangerang to play in Liga 1 in the 2022–23 season, on loan from Borneo. He made his league debut on 25 July 2022 in a match against Persik Kediri at the Indomilk Arena, Tangerang.

International career 
He made his international debut for Indonesia national team on 21 March 2017, against Myanmar, where he coming as a substitute.

Career statistics

Club

Honours

International
Indonesia U19
 AFF U-19 Youth Championship: 2013

References

External links
 
 

Indonesian footballers
1995 births
Living people
People of Batak descent
People from Deli Serdang Regency
Sportspeople from North Sumatra
PS Barito Putera players
Persik Kediri players
PSMS Medan players
Borneo F.C. players
Persita Tangerang players
Liga 2 (Indonesia) players
Liga 1 (Indonesia) players
Indonesia youth international footballers
Indonesia international footballers
Association football midfielders